The Asian Journal of Transfusion Science is a peer-reviewed open-access medical journal published on behalf of the Indian Society of Blood Transfusion and Immunohematology. The journal publishes articles on the subjects of blood transfusion and immunohematology.

Abstracting and indexing 
The journal is indexed with Abstracts on Hygiene and Communicable Diseases, CAB Abstracts, Caspur, CINAHL, DOAJ, EBSCO, EMCARE, Expanded Academic ASAP, JournalSeek, Global Health, Google Scholar, Health & Wellness Research Center, Health Reference Center Academic, Hinari, Index Copernicus, OpenJGate, PubMed, SCOLOAR, SIIC databases, Tropical Diseases Bulletin, and Ulrich's Periodicals Directory.

External links 
 

Open access journals
English-language journals
Biannual journals
Medknow Publications academic journals
Publications established in 2007
Hematology journals
Academic journals associated with learned and professional societies